Sajjan Singh is the name of:

 Sajjan Singh of Udaipur (1859–1884), Maharaja of the princely state of Udaipur, 1874–1884
 Sajjan Singh of Ratlam (1880–1912 or 1913), British Indian Army officer and Maharaja of Ratlam State, 1893–1947
 Sajjan Singh (wrestler) (fl. 1960s), Indian Olympic wrestler